The 2013 season was the Hawthorn Football Club's 89th season in the Australian Football League and 112th overall.

Overview

Playing list changes 
The following lists all player changes between the conclusion of the 2012 season and the beginning of the 2013 season.

Trades

Free Agency

Additions

Departures

Draft

AFL draft

Rookie draft

Retirements and delistings

2013 player squad

Fixture

NAB Cup

Premiership season

Ladder

Finals series

Awards, Records & Milestones

Awards
 Round 3 - Jed Anderson - 2013 AFL Rising Star nomination
 Round 6 - Brad Hill - 2013 AFL Rising Star nomination
 Round 23 - Jarryd Roughead - Coleman Medallist
 All Australian Selection - Sam Mitchell,  Jarryd Roughead
 Coleman Medal - Jarryd Roughead
 Norm Smith Medal - Brian Lake

Records
300th goal - Jarryd Roughead 
150th goal - Luke Hodge
150th goal - Cyril Rioli 
100th goal - Jordan Lewis  
100th goal - Luke Breust
100th goal - Jack Gunston
50th goal - Isaac Smith

Hawthorn win 12 games in a row from round 2 to 14. Equal 1961 as club's longest winning run.

Milestones
 Round 1 - Jed Anderson ( AFL debut)
 Round 3 - Taylor Duryea (AFL debut)
 Round 5 - Brian Lake (Debut at Hawthorn)
 Round 6 - Jonathan Simpkin (Debut at Hawthorn)
 Round 6 - David Hale (50th AFL game for Hawthorn)
 Round 7 - Brian Lake (200th AFL game) 
 Round 8 - Matthew Spangher (Debut at Hawthorn)
 Round 9 - Sam Grimley (AFL debut)
 Round 9 - Luke Breust (50th AFL game)
 Round 9 - Paul Puopolo (50th AFL game)
 Round 13 - Brent Guerra (150th AFL game for Hawthorn)
 Round 14 - John Ceglar (AFL debut)
 Round 14 - Isaac Smith (50th AFL game)
 Round 17 - Will Langford (AFL debut)
 Round 17 - Shane Savage (50th AFL game)
 Round 19 - Brent Guerra (250th AFL game)
 Round 20 - Jack Gunston (50th AFL game)
 Qual Final - First time ever, Hawthorn's all-time 'points for' tally was greater than their all-time 'points against' tally.

References

Hawthorn Football Club Season, 2013
Hawthorn Football Club seasons